The Fowlkes-Boyle House is a historic house in Memphis, Tennessee, U.S.. It was built circa 1850 for Sterling Fowlkes. It belonged to the Boyle family from 1873 to 1920. It has been listed on the National Register of Historic Places since August 7, 1974.

References

Houses on the National Register of Historic Places in Tennessee
Victorian architecture in Tennessee
Houses completed in 1850
Houses in Memphis, Tennessee